Mahendra G. Nadkarni is a professor emeritus at University of Mumbai. Nadkarni obtained his Ph.D. in mathematics from Brown University, the US in 1964 for his work on Ergodic theory. His research interests include Ergodic Theory, Harmonic Analysis, and Probability Theory.

Nadkarni has taught at Washington University in St. Louis, University of Minnesota, Indian Statistical Institute (ISI), Calcutta University (1968–1981), University of Mumbai (1981–1998), Indian Institute of Technology Indore (2010–2012), and Centre for Excellence in Basic Sciences (2012-present). He teaches Measure Theory, Probability Theory and Stochastic Calculus to undergraduates at CEBS.

He was Head of the Department of Mathematics, at the University of Mumbai. He is a fellow of the Indian National Science Academy as well as the Indian Academy of Sciences. Nadkarni is an author of books on Ergodic theory.

Selected publications

with Sadanand G. Telang:

References

  University of Mumbai
 
  UM-DAE CEBS

Scientists from Mumbai
Konkani people
Brown University alumni
Living people
Year of birth missing (living people)
People from Uttara Kannada
Academic staff of the University of Calcutta
Washington University in St. Louis mathematicians
University of Minnesota faculty
Washington University in St. Louis faculty
Academic staff of the Indian Statistical Institute
Academic staff of the University of Mumbai